The Fire of Manisa refers to the burning of the town of Manisa, Turkey, which started on the night of Tuesday, 5 September 1922 and continued until 8 September. It was started and organized by the retreating Hellenic Army during the Greco-Turkish War of 1919-1922, and as a result 90 percent of the buildings in the town were destroyed. The number of victims in the town and adjacent region was estimated to be several thousand by US Consul James Loder Park. Turkish sources claim that 4,355 people died in the town of Manisa.

Background 

Manisa is a historic town in Western Anatolia beneath the north side of Mount Sipylus that became part of the Ottoman Empire in the 15th century. During Ottoman rule, the town was governed by several princes (called Şehzade) and so is also known as a "town of the princes" (Şehzadeler şehri). Many examples of Ottoman architecture were built over the next few centuries, such as the Muradiye Mosque, designed by the famous architect Mimar Sinan in 1586, and built for Murad III who was a governor of the town.

By the 19th century, Manisa was among the largest towns in the Aegean region of Anatolia, and its population before the fire is estimated to have been between 35,000 and 50,000. Manisa had a religiously and ethnically diverse population made up of Muslims, Christians and Jews but Turkish Muslims were the largest group. During the 19th century, there was an increase in other groups, most notably Greeks. In 1865 the population was estimated by the British at 40,000 with minorities of 5,000 Greeks, 2,000 Armenians and 2,000 Jews. In 1898 the population was estimated by the Ottoman linguist Sami Bey at 36,252 of which 21,000 were Muslims, 10,400 Greeks, and 2,000 Armenians.

After World War I, Greece, supported by the Allied Powers, decided that the area known as the "Smyrna territory" would be occupied and could later be incorporated into Greece. In accordance with this plan, Greek forces (with Allied support) landed in Smyrna on 15 May 1919 and the town was occupied on 26 May without armed opposition.  During the Greek Occupation, which lasted more than three years, there were complaints by the local Turks of bad treatment. During the Greco-Turkish War that followed the Greek invasion, atrocities were committed by both Turks and Greeks.

Fire 

A Turkish offensive started in August 1922 and the Greek army retreated towards Smyrna and the Aegean coast. During their retreat they carried out a scorched earth policy, burning towns and villages and committing atrocities along the way. Towns to the east of Manisa, such as Alaşehir and Salihli, were burned. Several days before the actual fire in Manisa, rumours were going around that the town would be burned. Turkish sources claim that the Greek and Armenian population got permission to leave from the Greek army and had already evacuated the area. Other sources confirm that the Christians fled before the Turkish advance. The Turkish sources claim that the local Turks and Muslims were ordered to stay in their houses, which most did until the day on which the fire started.

The burning of the town was carefully managed by the Greek army, and fires were started at multiple places by specially organized groups. According to Turkish sources a significant number of the arsonists were local Greeks and Armenians. During the night of Tuesday 5 September and the morning of 6 September, fires were started in the commercial Çarşı district (while looted was taking place) and at various other sites. Many people left their houses and fled to safety in the mountains and hills. During this chaos some people were killed by the Greeks or burnt to death. The population hid in the mountains for several days. Meanwhile, the Turkish army continued its rapid advance and, after some fighting with remaining Greek troops, they took control of the remains of the town on 8 September. By then most of the town had been destroyed.

Gülfem Kaatçılar İren, witnessed the fire as a little girl and remembers when she fled to the hills with her family:
This witness testimony is also verified with the testimony of General Fahrettin Altay, the commander of the 5th Cavalry Army Corps, the Army Corps to save the remaining buildings and people of Manisa from fire on the 8th of September:

Aftermath 
The town is believed to have lost many buildings and objects of historical significance, but a small area around the two imperial Ottoman mosques was saved from destruction. Today the town has grown again and had reached 309,050 inhabitants in 2012.

Damage 

The Turkish government set up a commission called Tetkik-i Mezalim or Tetkik-i Fecayi Heyeti "the atrocity committee" to research and document the events and atrocities. The Turkish author Halide Edip saw the town after the fire, as did Henry Franklin-Bouillon, the French government representative, who declared that out of 11,000 houses in the city of Magnesia (Manisa) only 1,000 remained. Patrick Kinross wrote, "Out of the eighteen thousand buildings in the historic holy city of Manisa, only five hundred remained." The total economic damage was estimated to be more than fifty million lira (in contemporary value). Some of the captured Greek soldiers were employed in the reconstruction, such as in the rebuilding of the destroyed Karaköy mosque.During the Lausanne negotiations the Turkish delegation stated that 9,084 buildings in the Sanjak of Manisa, outside the city, town centres were burned by the Greek Army. More than 92% of all buildings in the centre of Manisa were destroyed - 13,638 out of 14,773 buildings. The Greek Delegation's reply on the same day does not contradict this claim.

Loder Park, who toured much of the devastated area immediately after the Greek evacuation, described the situation he had seen as follows:

Victims 

The total number of victims during the fire is not known. Turkish sources estimate that 3,500 died in the fires and 855 were shot. A comparison can be made with several nearby towns that were also burned by the retreating Greeks. There were estimated to be 3,000 victims in Alaşehir and 1,000 in Turgutlu. The number who were wounded is also unknown. Turkish sources state that three hundred girls were raped and abducted by the Greeks. Many rape victims were thought to have remained silent out of fear or shame. A number of Greek troops were captured and some of them were lynched by the Turkish women they had raped. Colonel Stylianos Gonatas states that many of the Muslim victims were kept inside the houses while being burned just as in Kasaba. For that reason, the downtown was still dangerous for the Greek soldiers.

The Greek retreat was accompanied by looting and other people lost their possessions in the fires and lived for some time among the ruins of their homes or crowded together in the surviving buildings.

In Turkish literature 
The event is mentioned in a work by Turkish journalist Falih Rıfkı Atay. The Turkish poet İlhan Berk was a small child living in the Deveciler neighborhood at the time of the fire and fled to the mountains with his family. His older sister burned to death in their house. He wrote that he could never forget the flight to the mountains and wrote of other childhood memories of the events in his work Uzun Bir Adam. The historian Kamil Su also witnessed the fire as a 13-year-old living in the Alaybey neighborhood. On the morning of 6 September he fled with his family to the mountains. When he returned to his neighborhood he found corpses in the streets and most buildings razed to their foundations, only the walls of the historic Aydın mosque still standing; the corpse of an unknown man lay in the street in front of where Su's house had stood. He later wrote Manisa ve Yöresinde İşgal Acıları, a book about the Greek occupation and the fire.

Gallery

See also 
Fire of Smyrna (occurred a short time after Manisa on 13 September 1922)
 Outline and timeline of the Greek genocide

Notes

References

Bibliography 
 
 

Fires in Turkey
1922 fires in Europe
1922 in the Ottoman Empire
1922 disasters in the Ottoman Empire
Mass murder in 1922
Urban fires in Asia
Persecution of Turkish people